Historically, a milkmaid was a woman who milked cows and supplied milk.

Milkmaid may also refer to:

 Milkmaid (horse), a racehorse
 The Milkmaid (film), a 2020 Nigerian film
 The Milkmaid (Vermeer), a painting by Johannes Vermeer
 The Milkmaid of Bordeaux, a painting by Francisco Goya
 Burchardia umbellata, an herb of native woodlands and heath from southern Australia
 Cardamine californica, a flowering plant in the family Brassicaceae, native to California
 Nestlé Milkmaid (La Lechera in Spanish, Leite Moça in Portuguese), a dairy product brand by Nestlé